In enzymology, a (S)-tetrahydroprotoberberine N-methyltransferase is an enzyme that catalyzes the chemical reaction

S-adenosyl-L-methionine + (S)-7,8,13,14-tetrahydroprotoberberine  S-adenosyl-L-homocysteine + cis-N-methyl-(S)-7,8,13,14-tetrahydroprotoberberine

Thus, the two substrates of this enzyme are S-adenosyl methionine and (S)-7,8,13,14-tetrahydroprotoberberine, whereas its two products are S-adenosylhomocysteine and cis-N-methyl-(S)-7,8,13,14-tetrahydroprotoberberine.

This enzyme belongs to the family of transferases, specifically those transferring one-carbon group methyltransferases.  The systematic name of this enzyme class is S-adenosyl-L-methionine:(S)-7,8,13,14-tetrahydroprotoberberine cis-N-methyltransferase. This enzyme is also called tetrahydroprotoberberine cis-N-methyltransferase.  This enzyme participates in alkaloid biosynthesis i.

References

 

EC 2.1.1
Enzymes of unknown structure